Soyuz TM-8 was a 1989 spaceflight which carried the fifth long duration crew to the Soviet space station Mir. It was part of the Soyuz-TM series of spacecraft, which were the fourth generation of the Soviet Soyuz. Soyuz TM-8 was the eighth crewed spaceflight to Mir, and spent 166 days in orbit.

Crew
The crew consisted of two Soviet cosmonauts. They had both been in space, but only Viktorenko had previously been to Mir, which was a 7-day visit during Mir EP-1.

Launch and docking
The Soyuz-U2 rocket was painted with advertisements. During the Soyuz spacecraft's final approach to Mir (4 metre distance), the Kurs rendezvous and docking system malfunctioned, so Viktorenko took over manual control and withdrew to 20 metres, and then docked manually. The spacecraft spent 166 days attached to Mir, for the duration of the expedition Mir EO-5.

Return to Earth

Soyuz TM-8 landed at 04:36 UTC on 19 February 1990, after an uneventful flight to Earth.

References

Crewed Soyuz missions
1989 in the Soviet Union
Spacecraft launched in 1989